Gromin  is a village in the administrative district of Gmina Pułtusk, within Pułtusk County, Masovian Voivodeship, in east-central Poland.

The village has an approximate population of 240.

References

Gromin